The Sadler House is a frontier I-House  with Georgian architectural elements in McCalla, Alabama. The original single pen log house was built by John Loveless, who moved to Alabama from South Carolina in 1816.  The home's uniqueness is illustrated by and due to its original constructed form of a single pen log structure, now cocooned within the I-house, and the complex joinery details (akin to furniture joinery) used to hold the structural elements of the original house in place.  

After Loveless' death, his widow, Martha Daniel sold the two story clapboard-covered log cabin to Isaac Wellington Sadler.  The house was expanded in 1838 by Sadler, a planter and teacher. The two-story wood-frame house has a shed-roofed addition to the rear and a matching front porch structure. The interior is arranged around an open center hall running as a breezeway through the house with two rooms on either side. The hall and one parlor have faux-painted wainscoting. The detailing of the trim in the formal parlor is Greek Revival, while the remainder of the doors are a plain board-and-batten pattern.

The Sadler House was placed on the National Register of Historic Places on April 23, 1975. It is owned by the West Jefferson Historical Society.

References

External links

 
http://wjeffcohistsoc.org/sadler-house
Gamble, Robert Historic architecture in Alabama: a guide to styles and types, 1810-1930, pages 29–32. Tuscaloosa, Alabama: The University of Alabama Press, 1990. .
https://www.loc.gov/resource/hhh.al1358.sheet

National Register of Historic Places in Jefferson County, Alabama
Federal architecture in Alabama
Greek Revival houses in Alabama
Houses completed in 1838
Jefferson County, Alabama
Historic American Buildings Survey in Alabama